Chittagong-1 is a constituency represented in the Jatiya Sangsad (National Parliament) of Bangladesh since 2008 by Mosharraf Hossain of the Awami League.

Boundaries 
The constituency encompasses Mirsharai Upazila.

History 
The constituency was created for the first general elections in newly independent Bangladesh, held in 1973.

Members of Parliament

Elections

Elections in the 2010s 
Mosharraf Hossain was re-elected unopposed in the 2014 General Election after opposition parties withdrew their candidacies in a boycott of the election.

Elections in the 2000s

Elections in the 1990s 
Khaleda Zia stood for five seats in the June 1996 general election: Bogra-6, Bogra-7, Feni-1, Lakshmipur-2 and Chittagong-1. After winning all five, she chose to represent Feni-1 and quit the other four, triggering by-elections in them. Mosharraf Hossain was elected in a September 1996 by-election.

References

External links
 

Parliamentary constituencies in Bangladesh
Chittagong District